Lindegaard is a Danish surname. Notable people with the surname include:

Anders Lindegaard (born 1984), Danish footballer
Andy Lindegaard (born 1980), English footballer
Jørgen Lindegaard (born 1948), Danish businessman

Danish-language surnames